Zongo Junction is a nine-piece instrumental Afrobeat band based in Brooklyn, New York. The band was formed by Charles Ferguson after he spent six months in Ghana, West Africa. The members of Zongo Junction stretch the Afrobeat style to fit their musical interests, combining elements of Sun Ra, The Talking Heads, and Fela Kuti to create their own version of afrobeat. Zongo Junction released their five-song debut EP Thieves! in 2010.

The band may have adopted the name Zongo Junction from a bus stop of the same name in Madina, a suburb of Ghana's capital, Accra.

The band
Charlie Ferguson - Drums
Morgan Greenstreet - Percussion 
Jordan Hyde - Guitar  
David Lizmi - Bass
Ross Edwards - Keyboards
Adam Schatz - Tenor saxophone 
Matt Nelson - Tenor saxophone 
Jonah Parzen-Johnson - Baritone saxophone 
Kevin Moehringer - Trombone
Aaron Rockers - Trumpet

Discography 
 Big Sir - Single (2015)
No Discount (Electric Cowbell Records, 2014)
The Van That Got Away - Single (Primary Records, 2012)
Thieves! (2010)

References

Musical groups from Brooklyn
Afrobeat musicians